Rigdon may refer to:

People with the surname Rigdon 

 Kevin Rigdon
 Paul Rigdon
 Sidney Rigdon
 W. Bradford Rigdon

Places 

 Rigdon, Indiana

See also 
 Sidney Rigdon: A Portrait of Religious Excess